Liudvikas Simutis (August 27, 1935 – November 4, 2014) was a Lithuanian politician.  In 1990 he was among those who signed the Act of the Re-Establishment of the State of Lithuania.  He died in Kaunas, aged 79.

References
Biography

1935 births
2014 deaths
Lithuanian politicians
People from Telšiai District Municipality